Burbank is an unincorporated community in Wayne County, in the U.S. state of Missouri. The community is located on Missouri Route E, approximately 2.5 miles east-northeast of Greenville.

History
A post office called Burbank was established in 1908, and remained in operation until 1954. The community has the name of Luther Burbank, a botanist.

References

Unincorporated communities in Wayne County, Missouri
Unincorporated communities in Missouri